The 1926 Massachusetts gubernatorial election was held on November 2, 1926.

Incumbent Republican Governor Alvan T. Fuller was elected over Democrat William A. Gaston. This was Gaston's third and final unsuccessful bid for Governor.

Republican primary

Governor

Candidates

Declared
Alvan T. Fuller, incumbent Governor

Results
Governor Fuller was unopposed for renomination.

Lieutenant Governor

Candidates

Declared
Frank G. Allen, incumbent Lieutenant Governor

Results
Allen was unopposed for the Republican nomination.

Democratic primary

Governor

Candidates

Declared
William A. Gaston, son of former Governor William Gaston, nominee for Governor in 1908 and 1909, and nominee for United States Senate in 1922

Withdrew
John J. Cummings, former member of the Massachusetts House of Representatives and Democratic nominee for Lt. Governor in 1924.

Results
Gaston was unopposed for the Democratic nomination.

Lt. Governor

Candidates

Declared
Joseph B. Ely, former District Attorney for the Western District of Massachusetts and candidate for Governor in 1922

Withdrew
Harry J. Dooley (name remained on primary ballot)

Campaign
Harry J. Dooley and Joseph B. Ely competed for the Democratic nomination for Lieutenant Governor. Ely, an unsuccessful candidate for Governor in 1922, was tapped by the party leadership so that the party could present an ethnically diverse and geographically balanced ticket. On August 28, Dooley dropped out of the race and endorsed Ely in order to unite the party. As Dooley did not exit the race before the August 13 deadline for withdrawals, his name remained on the ballot. Nevertheless, Dooley ended up winning the primary with the support of Irish Americans. Dooley refused the nomination as did Ely, who believed the means to be an embarrassment (but officially cited his mother's illness as his reason for declining).

Dooley was replaced on the general election ballot by Fall River Mayor Edmond P. Talbot. Party leadership hoped that the popular French-Canadian politician would help the ticket attract votes from the state's 75,000 to 80,000 French-speaking residents, 75% of which were believed to be Republican supporters.

Results

Independents and third parties

Socialist
Walter S. Hutchins, perennial candidate

Socialist Labor
Samuel Leger, nominee for Secretary of the Commonwealth in 1924

Workers
Lewis Marks

General election

Results

See also
 1925–1926 Massachusetts legislature

References

Bibliography

Governor
1926
Massachusetts
November 1926 events